Petropavlivka is a village in Kupiansk Raion (district) in Kharkiv Oblast of eastern Ukraine, at about  east by south (EbS) of the centre of Kharkiv. Petropavlivka hosts the administration of the Petropavlivka rural hromada, one of the hromadas of Ukraine.

The settlement came under attack by Russian forces during the Russian invasion of Ukraine in 2022 and was regained by Ukrainian forces by the end of September the same year.

References

Villages in Kupiansk Raion